Shyam Singh Shashi is an Indian socio–anthropologist, litterateur and poet.

Biography
Shashi was born on 1 July 1935 at Haridwar in India. He did a master's degree in Man Management and Manpower Planning from Manchester University and obtained a doctoral degree in sociology from Agra University for his thesis on Himalayan Nomads making him the first person to complete a Ph.D. from the university. Shashi's doctoral advisor was the social scientist R. N. Saksena.

Starting his career as a government servant, he took voluntary retirement midway through his service and joined the International Institute of Culture and Languages as the chairman of their Media Research and Encyclopedia divisions where he is reported to have edited Encyclopedia of Humanities and Social Sciences (50 vols), Encyclopedia of Indian Tribes (12 vols), Encyclopedia of World Women (10 vols) and Encyclopedia Indica (150 vols).

Shashi is a visiting professor at the Indira Gandhi National Open University (IGNOU), the president of the International Academy of Children's Literature and chairs International Institute of Nomadic Studies. He served as the director of Indian Ministry of Information and Broadcasting's Publication Division, and as the honorary editor of Collected Works of Dr. B.R. Ambedkar which was published in eight Indian languages by the Indian government. He is a member of the jury for the Delhi Gaurav Awards.

Honours and awards
The University of Colombo honoured Shashi with D.Litt. (honoris causa) for his "pioneering work on Roma of Europe and America", making him the first recipient of D.Litt. from the university in anthropology. In 1990, the Government of India awarded him Padma Shri for his "multifaceted achievements in the field of literature".

Selected bibliography
Shashi has also written several poem anthologies, travelogues, children's books and anthropological books, over 300 publications in total.

References

External links
 

Recipients of the Padma Shri in literature & education
Indian male poets
Indian anthropologists
Indian social sciences writers
Indian children's writers
University of Colombo
Indira Gandhi National Open University
20th-century Indian non-fiction writers
Writers from Uttarakhand
Living people
20th-century Indian poets
20th-century Indian male writers
1935 births